No Turning Back is the second album by heavy metal band Jack Starr's Burning Starr. Released in 1986 by the Canadian label Napalm Records.

Track listing

Personnel
Mike Tirelli – Vocals
Jack Starr – Guitar
Keith "Thumper" Collins – Bass
Mark Edwards – Drums
David DeFeis – Keyboards

References 

1986 albums